Albertwoodemys is an extinct genus of podocnemidid turtle. From the Early Oligocene in the Jebel Qatrani Formation of Egypt.

References 

Podocnemididae
Prehistoric turtle genera
Extinct turtles